Alirezaabad-e Qadim  is a village in Parsabad County, Ardabil Province, Iran.

References

Tageo
Index Mundi

Towns and villages in Parsabad County